Valentinian II (37115 May 392) was a Roman emperor in the western part of the Roman empire between AD 375 and 392. He was at first junior co-ruler of his brother, was then sidelined by a usurper, and only after 388 sole ruler, albeit with limited de facto powers.

A son of emperor Valentinian I and empress Justina, he was raised to the imperial office at the age of 4 by military commanders upon his father's death. Until 383, Valentinian II remained a junior partner to his older half-brother Gratian in ruling the Western empire, while the East was governed by his uncle Valens until 378 and Theodosius I from 379. When Gratian was killed by the usurper emperor Magnus Maximus in 383, the court of Valentinian in Milan became the center of Italy where several religious debates took place. In 387, Maximus invaded Italy, spurring Valentinian and his family to escape to Thessalonica where they successfully sought Theodosius' aid. Theodosius defeated Maximus in battle and re-installed Valentinian in the West. However, Valentinian soon found himself struggling to break free from the control of general  Arbogast. In 392, Valentinian was discovered hanged in his room under unknown circumstances.

Early life and accession (371–375)
Valentinianus was born to Emperor Valentinian I and his second wife, Justina. He was the half-brother of Valentinian's other son, Gratian, who had shared the imperial title with his father since 367. He had three sisters: Galla, Grata and Justa. The elder Valentinian died on campaign in Pannonia in 375. Neither Gratian (then in Trier) nor his uncle Valens (emperor for the East) were consulted by the army commanders on the scene. Instead of merely acknowledging Gratian as his father's successor, Valentinian I's leading generals and officials, including Merobaudes,  Petronius Probus, and Cerealis, Valentinian II's maternal uncle and Justina's brother, acclaimed the four-year-old Valentinian augustus on 22 November 375 at Aquincum. The army, and its Frankish general Merobaudes, may have been uneasy about Gratian's lack of military ability, and to prevent a split of the army, so raised a boy who would not immediately aspire to military command. Also, he may have wanted to prevent more successful military commanders and officials, such as Sebastianus and Count Theodosius, from becoming emperors or gaining independent power, as Sebastianus was removed to a distant posting and Theodosius was executed within a year of Valentinian's elevation.

Reign from Milan (375–387)

Gratian was forced to accommodate the generals who supported his half-brother into his realm, though he purportedly took a liking to educating his brother. According to Zosimus, Gratian governed the trans-alpine provinces (including Gaul, Hispania, and Britain), while Italy, part of Illyricum, and North Africa were under the rule of Valentinian. However, Gratian and his court was essentially in charge of the whole Western empire, including Illyricum, and Valentinian did not issue any laws and was marginalized in textual sources. In 378, their uncle, the Emperor Valens, was killed in battle with the Goths at Adrianople, and Gratian invited the general Theodosius to be emperor in the East. As a child, Valentinian II was under the pro-Arian influence of his mother, empress Justina, and the courtiers at Milan, an influence contested by the Nicene bishop of Milan, Ambrose.

In 383, Magnus Maximus, commander of the armies in Britain, declared himself Emperor and established himself in Gaul and Hispania. Gratian was killed while fleeing him. As a lesser partner to Gratian in the West, Valentinian and his court in Milan had remained ineffectual and obscure until his brother's tragedy finally brought them to the forefront. For a time the court of Valentinian, through the mediation of Ambrose, came to an accommodation with the usurper, and Theodosius recognized Maximus as co-emperor of the West.

Valentinian tried to restrain the despoiling of pagan temples in Rome. Buoyed by this instruction, the pagan senators, led by Aurelius Symmachus, the Prefect of Rome, petitioned in 384 for the restoration of the Altar of Victory in the Senate House, which had been removed by Gratian in 382. Valentinian refused the request and, in so doing, rejected the traditions and rituals of pagan Rome to which Symmachus had appealed. While Ambrose participated in the campaign against the reinstatement of Altar of Victory, he admitted he was not the cause of the decision to remove the altar in the first place.

In 385 Ambrose refused an imperial request to hand over the Portian basilica for the celebration of Easter by the Imperial court, angering Justina, Valentinian, high-ranking officials, and other Arians at the court, including Goths. Ambrose argued in his letter that Justina used her influence over her young son to oppose the Nicean party which was championed by Ambrose, framing her motivation as selfish. However, not only Justina, but the wider imperial court also opposed Ambrose's claim, since the praetorian prefect and the emperor's counsellors met him and demanded that he turn over the basilica. When Ambrose was summoned to be punished to the Imperial palace, the orthodox populace rioted, and Gothic troops were prevented by the arch-bishop himself, standing in the doorway, from entering the Basilica. Rufinus, influenced by Ambrose's writing, claimed that when Ambrose was found to have determinedly infracted the new laws, Justina persuaded Valentinian to have him banished, and Ambrose was forced to barricade himself, with the enthusiastic backing of the people, within the walls of the Basilica. Rufinus continues that the imperial troops besieged him, but Ambrose held on, reinforcing the resolution of his followers by allegedly unearthing, beneath the foundations of the church, the bodies of two ancient martyrs. Later, Magnus Maximus was purported to have used the emperor's heterodoxy against him. Maximus indeed wrote a scathing letter attacking Valentinian for plotting against God.

In 386 to 387, Maximus crossed the Alps into the Po valley and threatened Milan. Valentinian II and Justina fled to Theodosius in Thessalonica. The latter came to an agreement, cemented by his marriage to Valentinian's sister Galla, to restore the young emperor in the West. In 388, Theodosius marched west and defeated Maximus. Although he was to appoint both of his sons emperor (Arcadius in 383, Honorius in 393), Theodosius tolerated Valentinian, and made him a subordinate ruler to him.

Reign from Vienne (388–392)

After the defeat of Maximus, Theodosius remained in Milan until 391. Valentinian took no part in Theodosius's triumphal celebrations over Maximus. Valentinian and his court were installed at Vienne in Gaul, while Theodosius appointed key administrators in the West and had coins minted, which implied his guardianship over the 17-year-old. Justina had already died, and Vienne was far away from the influence of Ambrose. Theodosius's trusted general, the Frank Arbogast, was appointed magister militum for the Western provinces (bar Africa) and guardian of Valentinian. Acting in the name of Valentinian, Arbogast was actually subordinate only to Theodosius. While the general campaigned successfully on the Rhine, the young emperor remained at Vienne, in contrast to his warrior father and his older brother, who had campaigned at his age. Arbogast's domination over the emperor was considerable, and the general even murdered Harmonius, a friend of Valentinian suspected of taking bribes, in the emperor's presence.

The crisis reached a peak when Arbogast prohibited the emperor from leading the Gallic armies into Italy to oppose a barbarian threat. Valentinian, in response, formally dismissed Arbogast. The latter ignored the order, publicly tearing it up and arguing that Valentinian had not appointed him in the first place. The reality of where the power lay was openly displayed. Valentinian wrote to Theodosius and Ambrose complaining of his subordination to his general. In explicit rejection of his earlier Arianism, he invited Ambrose to come to Vienne to baptize him.

Death
On 15 May 392, Valentinian was found hanged in his residence in Vienne. Arbogast maintained that the emperor's death was suicide. Many sources believe, however, that Arbogast murdered him with his own hands, or paid the Praetorians. Zosimus writing in the early sixth century from Constantinople, states that Arbogast had Valentinian murdered; ancient authorities are divided in their opinion. Some modern scholars lean toward suicide. Ambrose's eulogy is the only contemporary Western source for Valentinian's death. It is ambiguous on the question of the emperor's death, which is not surprising, as Ambrose represents him as a model of Christian virtue. Suicide, not murder, would make the bishop dissemble on this key question.

The young man's body was conveyed in ceremony to Milan for burial by Ambrose, mourned by his sisters Justa and Grata. He was laid in a porphyry sarcophagus next to his brother Gratian, most probably in the Chapel of Sant'Aquilino attached to San Lorenzo.

At first Arbogast recognized Theodosius's son Arcadius as emperor in the West, seemingly surprised by his charge's death.  After three months, during which he had no communication from Theodosius, Arbogast selected an imperial official, Eugenius, as emperor. Theodosius initially tolerated this regime but, in January 393, elevated the eight-year-old Honorius as augustus to succeed Valentinian II. Civil war ensued and, in 394, Theodosius defeated Eugenius and Arbogast at the Battle of the Frigidus.

Significance
Valentinian himself seems to have exercised no real authority, and was a figurehead for various powerful interests: his mother, his co-emperors, and powerful generals. Since the Crisis of the Third Century the empire had been ruled by powerful generals, a situation formalised by Diocletian and his collegiate system which collapsed a year after his abdication in 305. Constantine I and his sons, strong military figures, re-established the practice of hereditary succession, a system that Valentinian I continued to maintain. The obvious flaw in these two competing requirements came in the reign of Valentinian II, a child. His reign was a harbinger of the fifth century, when children or nonentities, reigning as emperors, were controlled by powerful generals and officials in the West and in the East until mid-century.

See also
List of unsolved murders
Illyrian emperors

Notes

References

Bibliography
 .
 
 .
McEvoy, Meaghan A. (2013), Child Emperor Rule in the Late Roman West, A.D. 367–455. Oxford: Oxford University Press.

External links

 .  This list of Roman laws of the fourth century shows laws passed by Valentinian II relating to Christianity.

 .
 .
 .
	

371 births
392 deaths
4th-century Christians
4th-century Roman emperors
4th-century Roman consuls
Ancient child monarchs
Arian Christians
Deaths by hanging
Deified Roman emperors
Illyrian people
Imperial Roman consuls
Murdered Roman emperors
Sons of Roman emperors
Valentinianic dynasty
Illyrian emperors